Jorgen may refer to:

Jørgen, a Scandinavian masculine given name
Jörgen, an Austrian village
Jörgen (name), a Scandinavian masculine given name